Mériel is a commune in the Val-d'Oise department and Île-de-France region of France. Mériel station has rail connections to Persan, Saint-Leu-la-Forêt and Paris.

Population

Notable residents
 Jean Gabin, actor (1904–1976). Gabin spent his childhood in Mériel where a museum has been dedicated to his life and work.
 Fernand Braudel, historian (1902–1985).
 Pavlos Pavlidis, musician and poet (resided from 1980 to 1992). Famous for being the singer, lyricist and guitarist for the band Τα Ξύλινα Σπαθιά.

Town twinning
Mériel is twinned with:
  Llanwrtyd Wells in Wales

See also
Communes of the Val-d'Oise department

References

External links

Official website 
Association of Mayors of the Val d'Oise 

Communes of Val-d'Oise